The 2001 AK Pipe International Cup was a friendly football tournament that took place in Mashhad, Iran. The tournament was sponsored by 
Aria Kavan Trading & Production Group.

Revenues generated from ticket sales for this tournament went towards refugees from war torn Afghanistan.

Köpetdag Aşgabat fielded two Iranian footballers in the game against Aboomoslem, the two were Ali Khosravi and Mehdi Khazaei.

Participant teams

Initially this tournament was going to be held in August 2001 and the four participants were going to be Persepolis F.C., Partsazan Khorasan, Köpetdag Aşgabat and AK Pipe Mashhad. However Persepolis F.C. decided not to take part
in the tournament due to several players' injuries.

The tournament was postponed to October and the participants were as follow:

Semifinals

Third place Match

Final

Statistics

Top scorers

Cards

Champion

References

2001
2001–02 in Iranian football
2001 in Turkmenistani football